Lists of leaders of major religions in any given century include:

List of 21st-century religious leaders
List of 20th-century religious leaders
List of 19th-century religious leaders
List of 18th-century religious leaders
List of 17th-century religious leaders
List of 16th-century religious leaders
List of 15th-century religious leaders
List of 14th-century religious leaders
List of 13th-century religious leaders
List of 12th-century religious leaders
List of 11th-century religious leaders
List of 10th-century religious leaders
List of 9th-century religious leaders
List of 8th-century religious leaders
List of 7th-century religious leaders
List of 6th-century religious leaders
List of 5th-century religious leaders

See also
Lists of popes, patriarchs, primates, archbishops, and bishops
List of rabbis
List of founders of religious traditions
List of Dalai Lama
Supreme Patriarch of Thailand